Ein Yaakov is a 16th-century compilation of all the Aggadic material in the Talmud together with commentaries. Its introduction contains an account of the history of Talmudic censorship and the term Gemara. It was compiled by Jacob ibn Habib and (after his death) by his son Rabbi Levi ibn Habib.

Ein Yaakov was "especially treasured by laborers and others" who lacked the schooling to learn the more difficult parts of the Talmud. Synagogues commonly hold daily Ein Yaakov classes. With its commentaries, it is also a work of serious scholarship.

Many prints of Ein Yaakov include commentaries that illuminate the simple meaning of the text and provide additional insight, including the author's own, "Ha-Kotev". The most important commentary is that of Leo di Modena, under the title "Ha-Boneh", which has appeared in all editions since 1684. The Vilna edition (1883) contains twenty commentaries, mainly reproducing other works on Midrash and Aggadah, esp. those by Zundel ben Joseph and Maharsha. 
Hayyim Abulafia's "Shebut Ya'akob" was written in 1733.
The more recent Ein Ayah is a separate four-volume work by Rabbi Abraham Isaac Kook, begun in 1883.

Older prints of the work often include a Yiddish translation.

An English translation in 5 volumes appeared in 1921, prepared by Rabbi Shmuel Tzvi Hirsch Glick of Chicago. It presents the original text on the right column of each page, with the corresponding English version to its left. It does not include any of the commentaries that appear in the classic version, but Rabbi Glick's translation and accompanying footnotes suffice for comprehension. Another English translation, by Avraham Yaakov Finkel, titled Ein Yaakov: The Ethical and Inspirational Teachings of the Talmud, was compiled in one volume. Beginning in 2019, Mesorah Publications has begun releasing its translation.

A Russian-language translation was completed by Rabbi Boruch Gorin in 2016, and published by LeChaim.

References

External links
 Ein Yaakov (full text), Sefaria
 Audio lectures, Rabbi Zvi Aryeh Rosenfeld
 Ayin Ayah (full text), Hebrew Wikisource

Talmud
Aggadic Midrashim
Hebrew-language religious books